The voiced glottal fricative, sometimes called breathy-voiced glottal transition, is a type of sound used in some spoken languages which patterns like a fricative or approximant consonant phonologically, but often lacks the usual phonetic characteristics of a consonant.

In many languages,  has no place or manner of articulation. Thus, it has been described as a breathy-voiced counterpart of the following vowel from a phonetic point of view. However, its characteristics are also influenced by the preceding vowels and whatever other sounds surround it. Therefore, it can be described as a segment whose only consistent feature is its breathy voice phonation in such languages. It may have real glottal constriction in a number of languages (such as Finnish), making it a fricative.

Lamé contrasts voiceless and voiced glottal fricatives.

Features
Features of the voiced glottal fricative:
 Its phonation is breathy voiced, or murmured, which means the vocal cords are loosely vibrating, with more air escaping than in a modally voiced sound. It is sometimes referred to as a "voiced h". Strictly speaking this is incorrect, as there is no voicing.
 In some languages, it has the constricted manner of articulation of a fricative. However, in many if not most it is a transitional state of the glottis with no manner of articulation other than its phonation type. Because there is no other constriction to produce friction in the vocal tract, most phoneticians no longer consider  to be a fricative. True fricatives may have a murmured phonation in addition to producing friction elsewhere. However, the term "fricative" is generally retained for the historical reasons.
 It may have a glottal place of articulation. However, it may have no fricative articulation, making the term glottal mean that it is articulated by the vocal folds, but this is the nature of its phonation rather than a separate articulation. All consonants except for the glottals, and all vowels, have an individual place of articulation in addition to the state of the glottis. As with all other consonants, surrounding vowels influence the pronunciation , and accordingly  has only the place of articulation of these surrounding vowels.

Occurrence

See also
Creaky-voiced glottal approximant

Notes

References

External links
 

Glottal consonants
Approximant-fricative consonants
Pulmonic consonants
Voiced oral consonants